Baishey Srabon (22 Shey Srabon)  is a 2011 Indian Bengali neo-noir  psychological thriller film directed by Srijit Mukherji. It was his second film. The cast consists of Prosenjit Chatterjee, Parambrata Chatterjee, Raima Sen, Abir Chatterjee and director Gautam Ghose, making a comeback after a 29-year absence. The film centers on two journalists and two police officers (one suspended) chasing a vengeful  psychopath, who leaves behind couplets from Bengali poems. Baishe Srabon received positive reviews from critics, and was one of the highest-grossing Bengali films of 2011. The film received an A certificate from the Central Board of Film Certification for explicit violence and adult language. This film brought back the Thriller genre to Bengali Cinema after a long time. The core plot of the movie is loosely based on the 1995 crime-thriller Seven and 2008 drama-thriller Righteous Kill. A sequel of the film was released on 23 January 2020, titled Dwitiyo Purush directed by Srijit Mukherji with Parambrata Chattopadhyay, Abir Chatterjee and Raima Sen reprising their roles.

Plot
Several murders have taken place throughout Kolkata, for which a serial killer is believed responsible. The murderer strikes in accordance with verses of Bengali poetry, which he leaves next to the victims. The police are baffled; chief detective Abhijit Pakrashi (Parambrata Chatterjee) struggles to solve the case, which takes a toll on his relationship with girlfriend Amrita Mukherjee (Raima Sen). Pakrashi's superior (Rajesh Sharma) brings back an ex-cop, Prabir (Prosenjit Chatterjee), to help solve the case. Prabir, earlier suspended for his violent methods, is notoriously ill-tempered and foul-mouthed. Prabir and Pakrashi work together, while Amrita (a television journalist) and colleague Surya Sinha (Abir Chatterjee) research serial killers for a series whose thirteenth-and-final episode will be about a contemporary murderer. Meanwhile, eccentric poet Nibaron Chakraborty (Gautam Ghosh) who considers himself part of the Hungry Generation wanders Kolkata at night reciting poems.

Researching serial killers, Amrita visits a prison where the warden remembers Rafique Ahmed and his only confidant in 18 years of imprisonment: Nibaron Chakraborty. She and Surya go to Nibaron's house to question him; after being greeted by his servant, Swapan, they are convinced he is insane when Nibaron says he has a meeting with "Rabindranath". They almost succeed in learning about Rafique when Surya angers him by mentioning the book-fair arson for which he was imprisoned.

While investigating the case, Pakrashi sees Amrita and Surya together. Jealous and drunk, Abhijit goes to Prabir's house and pours out his heart; he tells Prabir that he lost his father at a young age, and tries to avoid alcohol because of what it did to his father. Prabir tells Pakrashi that he went to work the day after losing his wife and child, encouraging him to be strong. Surya takes Amrita to a cemetery, telling her he would propose in a few days. They end up in a police station after a police officer sees them (and is slapped by Amrita). Pakrashi, still tipsy, rescues them when the inspector recognises Amrita as his girlfriend and they reconcile.

The next day, while randomly discussing poets and poems, Prabir and Pakrashi deduce that the killer strikes on the death anniversaries of well-known Bengali poets. When they search all possible days the killer could strike, they discover that the next date is 29 June: Michael Madhusudan Dutt's death anniversary.

Amrita tells Pakrashi what she and Surya have been doing, including the interview with Nibaron. This convinces him that Nibaron is the killer, especially when Swapan tells Prabir about his employer's nightly walks around the city. The duo visit Nibaron as journalists, and try to understand his stance on the Hungry Generation. It becomes clear that Nibaron doesn't consider the movement to be a failure, and has no regret about his attempted arson at the book fair years ago.

Pakrashi and Prabir watch Nibaron's house on the fateful night. A hooded figure comes out; it is Swapan, fleeing. He reveals that Nibaron has been very depressed, and has been burning all his poetry. In the house they find Nibaron has committed suicide, and discovering another couplet beside his body, realize this was the final murder. The case is closed, and Prabir is congratulated by the police department for solving the case.

After a month or so, Rabindranath Tagore's death anniversary (Baishe Srabon) arrives. Prabir invites Pakrashi to meet a man named Rabindranath Mitra, a publisher, and Pakrashi is surprised that "Swapan" is Prabir's servant Kanai. Prabir admits that he was the mastermind behind the murders, with Kanai (an ex-convict) carrying them out. He wanted to exact revenge on the police force for his suspension, which he considered an insult to his hard work despite the loss of his family. It was easy to frame Nibaron, since his case was handled by Prabir years ago. The latter had told Rabindranath to meet Nibaron regularly regarding publishing his poems, and then suddenly refusing, which led Nibaron to suicide. He also says that Nibaron's death wasn't the final murder. Pakrashi believes himself to be the next victim. However, Prabir makes it very clear that he considers himself a murderer, and intends to kill himself since he "hates murderers". Despite Pakrashi pleading with him not to, Prabir shoots himself after reciting the last couplet.

Cast
 Prosenjit Chatterjee as Deputy Commissioner of Police Probir Roy Chowdhury IPS
 Parambrata Chatterjee as Assistant Commissioner of Police Abhijit Pakrashi KP
 Raima Sen as Amrita Mukherjee
 Abir Chatterjee as Surjo Sinha
 Goutam Ghose as Nibaron Chakraborty
 Rajesh Sharma as Commissioner of Police Amit Kumar Srivastav IPS
 Anindya Banerjee  as Debabrata
 Sumit Samaddar as Kanai or Swapan
 June Malia as Prabir's wife
 Arindol Bagchi as Constable at the graveyard
 Joyraj Bhattacharya as Rabindranath
 Kalyan Chatterjee as drunkard at the station 
 Biplab Dasgupta as jailor 
 Biswajit Chakraborty as public prosecutor

Soundtrack 

The Baishe Srabon soundtrack is composed and the lyrics penned by Anupam Roy. The background music composed by Indraadip Dasgupta. Soundtrack got released on 27 August 2011.

Literary references
Baishe Srabon is the first mainstream film incorporating the Bengali "hungry generation" movement of the 1960s into its plot. In the end Prabir recites  Shesher Kobita by Kabiguru  Rabindranath Tagore.It was his last essay before his passing away in 22 srabon( titles of the film)and the novel is considered a landmark.

Reception
Anandabazar Patrika gave Baishe Srabon 8.5 of 10 stars. It was the official selection at the 2011 Dubai International Film Festival, the closing film at the 2012 London Indian Film Festival and an official selection at the Darpan Film Festival in Singapore and the Alliance Francaise Film Festival in Kolkata.

The film ran for 105 days, making it one of the most successful of the year. Baishe Srabon received 41 awards. At the Mirchi Music Awards, it won for Best Upcoming Lyricist (Anupam Roy for "Ekbar Bol"), Best Lyricist (Anupam Roy for "Ekbar Bol"), Best Background Score, Best Film Album (Popular Choice), Best Film Album (Critic's Choice), Best Song (Popular Choice) for "Ekbar Bol" and Best Song (Critic's Choice) for "Gobhire Jao".

At the Kalakaar Awards, it was the best film; at the ABP-Friend's FM Bangla Music Awards it won for Best Music Director, Best Male Playback Singer (Rupankar for "Gobhire Jao"), Best Song ("Je Kota Din") and Best Film Album. Baishe Srabon won the inaugural Best Movie Poster Award at Srijon Samman 2012; at the 12th Telecine Awards it won the Best Director, Best Supporting Actor (Parambrata Chatterjee) and Best Male Playback (Anupam Roy for "Ekbar Bol") awards.

At the Zee Banglar Gourab Awards 2012, the film received nine awards from thirteen nominations: Best Film, Best Director, Best Actor Critic's Choice (Prosenjit Chatterjee), Best Supporting Actor (Parambrata Chatterjee), Best Music Director, Best Screenplay and Dialogues, Best Male Playback (Rupankar for "Gobhire Jao"), Best Cinematography and Best Editing. At the 2012 Star Guide Bengali Film Awards the film won the Best Director, Best Cinematography and Best Male Playback (Anupam Roy for "Ekbar Bol") awards.

At the International Bangla Film Academy Awards at Pattaya, Bangkok, Baishe Srabon won the Best Director, Best Screenplay, Best Actor in a Supporting Role (Gautam Ghosh), Best Male Playback Singer (Anupam Roy), Best Cinematography and Best Critic's Choice Performance (Parambrata Chatterjee) awards. Raima Sen received her first award for her performance in the film with the Shoilojanando Mukhopadhyay Memorial Award. The film won six awards at the International Bangla Film Critic Award (IBFCA). The film was also the official selection at the Dubai International Film Festival, London Indian Film Festival and Mumbai International Film Festival (MAMI).

Sequel
A Sequel of the film was released on 23 January 2020, titled Dwitiyo Purush directed by Srijit Mukherji with Parambrata Chattopadhyay, Abir Chatterjee and Raima Sen reprising their roles.

References

External links
 
 
 Facebook Page

2011 films
Films scored by Anupam Roy
Indian crime thriller films
2011 crime thriller films
Indian detective films
Bengali-language Indian films
2010s Bengali-language films
2011 psychological thriller films
Films set in Kolkata
Memorials to Rabindranath Tagore
Indian psychological thriller films
Films directed by Srijit Mukherji
Indian serial killer films
2010s serial killer films